School Psychology Review is a quarterly peer-reviewed academic journal published by the National Association of School Psychologists. It was established in 1972 and covers issues related to educational psychology, specifically school psychology. The editor-in-chief is Shane Jimerson (University of California Santa Barbara).

Abstracting and indexing 
The journal is abstracted and indexed in the Social Sciences Citation Index and Academic Search Complete. According to the Journal Citation Reports, the journal has a 2013 impact factor of 1.655, ranking it 15th out of 53 journals in the category "Psychology, Educational".

References

External links 
 

Academic journals published by learned and professional societies
Educational psychology journals
Publications established in 1972
Quarterly journals
English-language journals